Libération is a daily francophone Moroccan newspaper.

History and profile
Libération was established in 1964. The paper is the media outlet of the Socialist Union of Popular Forces party. It is based in Casablanca and is the sister publication of the Arabic language newspaper Al Ittihad Al Ichtiraki.

The 2001 circulation of the paper was 60,000 copies. It was 5,000 copies in 2003.

See also
 List of newspapers in Morocco

References

External links 
 Official Site (in French)

1964 establishments in Morocco
Publications established in 1964
French-language newspapers published in Morocco
Newspapers published in Morocco
Socialist newspapers
Mass media in Casablanca